Borislav Kostić (24 February 1887 – 3 November 1963) was a Yugoslav chess grandmaster and a popularizer of the game.

Life and chess 
Borislav Kostic was born in Vršac, Kingdom of Hungary, at the time part of Austria-Hungary. His father Dimitrije was a merchant and his mother was Emilija (née: Mandukić). He learned chess around the age of ten and made rapid progress while studying Oriental Trade in Budapest. He also spent time in Vienna, the chess capital of the day, and this enabled him to get the high level practice necessary to take his game to the next level.

In 1910 he moved to Cologne and from there, travelled and toured extensively, mainly in the Americas, playing matches against local champions and simultaneous blindfold chess. At New York in 1916, he once played twenty opponents without sight of a board and won nineteen games and drew one, while engaging in polite conversation with opponents and spectators.  

Kostic played more formal matches against Frank Marshall, Jackson Showalter, and Paul Leonhardt, and won them all. At Havana in 1919 however, his winning streak ended with a 5–0 loss to Capablanca. Capablanca wrote that his own career peaked with this match. Kostic also played tournaments while in the United States, including New York 1916, Chicago 1918 and New York 1918, where he finished second behind Capablanca.  

On the European circuit, he won at Stockholm 1913, finished second at Hastings 1919 and won at Hastings 1921/1922. At Trencianske Teplice 1928, he won ahead of Steiner, Sämisch and Spielmann. At Bled 1931, he finished in tenth place, but nevertheless outscored fellow chessmasters Maróczy, Colle and Pirc. At Bucharest 1932, he won the title of Romanian champion. At Belgrade 1935, he shared the title of Yugoslav champion with Pirc, and went on to become sole champion in 1938. He won at Ljubljana the same year.

From 1923 to 1926, Kostic travelled to Australasia, the Far East, Africa, India, and Siberia. In one match held in Africa at the equator, Kostic was in the northern hemisphere, and his opponent on the southern.

In the late 1920s, he made another trip to the Americas. He represented Yugoslavia in four Chess Olympiads (London 1927, Prague 1931, Warsaw 1935, and Stockholm 1937), and in the 3rd unofficial Chess Olympiad at Munich 1936.

During World War II, Kostić was imprisoned in a concentration camp by a Nazi SS commander (Schiller) because he declined to participate in tournaments called "Free Europa" and to glorify the Nazi regime. Afterwards, he played chess only in a more minor capacity. His final appearance was at the Zürich veterans tournament of 1962, which he won. Kostic was awarded the Grandmaster title by FIDE in 1950, on its inaugural list. He was fluent in Russian, English, Hungarian, German, Spanish and Hebrew. He died in Belgrade in 1963, aged 76.

See also
 Italian Game, Blackburne Shilling Gambit
 Svetozar Gligorić
 Dragoljub Velimirović

References

Further reading
 
Biographic Article at Chess.vrsac.com

External links

About Bora Kostic, the first serbian grandmaster
https://web.archive.org/web/20070221010007/http://www.rogerpaige.me.uk/index.htm
http://www.olimpbase.org
Muhlock vs Kostic – Koln 1912
Borislav Kostic by Paolo Bagnoli, Soloscacch, 17 febbraio 2015
CHESS MATCH FOR $2,500.; Capablanca Accepts Challenge of Boris Kostich The New York Times, 19 December 1918
Paper Past: European Chess Master – Visit of M. Boris Kostich, Press, Volume LX, Issue 18148, 11 August 1924
Chess Champion Welcomed in Sydney
 Visitor's book of Melbourne Chess Club
The Serbian Chess Master M. Boris Kostich in Singapore, The Singapore Free Press and Mercantile Advertiser (1884–1942), 20 October 1925

1887 births
1963 deaths
People from Vršac
Chess grandmasters
Chess Olympiad competitors
Yugoslav chess players